The Cocanada AC Express is a tri-weekly AC Express train belonging to South Central Railway zone which connects  and .

It operates as train number 12775 from Kakinada Town to Lingampalli and as train number 12776 in the reverse direction, serving the states of Andhra Pradesh and Telangana.

Loco
From Kakinada Town to Lingampalli, it is hauled by WDM-3A or WDG-3G twins of Kazipet shed.

Routeing

The 12775/ 12776 Cocanada AC Express runs from Kakinada Town via , Tanuku, Akividu, Kaikaluru, *, Lingampalli.

Timetable 
12775 starts from Kakinada Town every Sunday, Tuesday, Thursday at 20:10 hrs IST and reaches Lingampalli every Monday, Wednesday, Friday at 7:30 AM IST

12776 starts from Lingampalli every Monday, Wednesday, Friday at 20:00 hrs IST and reaches Kakinada Town on Tuesday, Thursday, Saturday at morning 7:18 AM IST

Coach composition 

 1 AC I Tier + II Tier (hybrid) 
 4 AC II Tier
 12 AC III Tier

References 

Transport in Kakinada
Transport in Secunderabad
Rail transport in Andhra Pradesh
AC Express (Indian Railways) trains
Railway services introduced in 2012
Rail transport in Telangana